Tafalisca lurida, known generally as the silent bush cricket or robust bush cricket, is a species of true cricket in the family Gryllidae. It is found in the Caribbean Sea, North America, and the Caribbean.

References

Hapithinae
Articles created by Qbugbot
Insects described in 1869